{{DISPLAYTITLE:C24H25FN4O2}}
The molecular formula C24H25FN4O2 (molar mass: 420.479 g/mol) may refer to:

 Filorexant (MK-6096)
 Ocaperidone

Molecular formulas